Beni Bertrand Binobagira (born 5 April 1989 in Bujumbura) is a Burundian swimmer. At the 2012 Summer Olympics, he competed in the Men's 100 metre freestyle, finishing in 56th place overall in the heats, failing to qualify for the semifinals.

References

Living people
Olympic swimmers of Burundi
Swimmers at the 2012 Summer Olympics
Burundian male freestyle swimmers
Sportspeople from Bujumbura

1989 births
20th-century Burundian people
21st-century Burundian people